The FIS Nordic Junior and U23 World Ski Championships 2013 took place in Liberec, Czech Republic from 20 January to 27 January 2013. It was the 36th Junior World Championships and the 8th Under-23 World Championships in nordic skiing.

Medal summary

Junior events

Cross-country skiing

Nordic Combined

Ski jumping

Under-23 events

Cross-country skiing

Medal table

References 

2013
2013 in cross-country skiing
2013 in ski jumping
Junior World Ski Championships
2013 in youth sport
International sports competitions hosted by the Czech Republic